Μyli (referred also as: Myloi, Mili or even Muloi. In Greek: Μύλοι)  is a part of the local community of Chromonastiri of the Rethymno Municipality in the  Rethymno (regional unit) of the region of Crete established by Kallikratis reform. Capital of  the new municipality is Rethymno.

When discussing Myli we refer both to a village built in the early 1970s (“new Myli”) and to two deserted small villages with the same name (or referred as “ano Myli” and “Kato Myli”), remains of which can be found within the Gorge of Myli.

Geography and History 
Taking the road south of Chromonastiri you will arrive at the village of Myli after 1.5 km. In order to visit the (old deserted village of ) Myli you have to walk down the path, which leads to the gorge, where the village is situated. Its name is derived from the many water mills, which were once in operation. A visit to this village is also worthwhile for its abundant vegetation and picturesque location.
There are references that the area of Myli was occupied from  the Ottoman period onwards (but there are many buildings, remains of the Venetian period).
Population of  Chromonastiri  (and Myli in particular)

Attractions: The Gorge of Myli 
The gorge of Myli is ideal for walk, it takes just one hour to walk through this full of green gorge. The gorge starts at Chromonastiri and ends up at the village Xiro Chorio. There is a small river in the gorge and the deserted old village of Myli, where one can see samples of traditional architecture, old churches and caves.

See also
List of settlements in the Rethymno regional unit

External links 
Photo Gallery, Web site of municipality of Rethymnno retrieved at 9 April 2012
Cycling routes, Web site of Tourism Promotion Committee of Rethymno Prefecture, retrieved at 9 April 2012

References

Populated places in Rethymno (regional unit)